Jennifer Raegan Pebley (née Scott; born August 12, 1975) is an American basketball coach and former player. 

Pebley has been the head women's coach at three NCAA Division I institutions, most recently TCU. Pebley played two seasons in the Women's National Basketball Association (WNBA) as Raegan Scott. A 6'4" forward, Pebley played college basketball at Colorado.

Early life and college playing career
Born and raised in Orem, Utah, Pebley (born Jennifer Raegan Scott) graduated from Mountain View High School in Utah in 1993. Pebley then attended the University of Colorado Boulder and played at forward for the Colorado Buffaloes from 1993 to 1997. Pebley averaged 8.4 points and 5.6 rebounds and shot .445 from the field in 124 games. Pebley earned second-team All-Big 12 honors in 1997 and graduated from Colorado with a bachelor's degree in broadcast journalism.

Professional playing career
Pebley was drafted in the third round of the 1997 WNBA draft by the Utah Starzz. In the 1997 season, Pebley played eight games and averaged 5.4 minutes, 1.5 points, and 0.9 rebounds. In 1998, she moved to the Cleveland Rockers for her final WNBA season. She played 22 games and averaged 7.6 minutes, 1.7 points, and 1.3 rebounds.

Coaching career
While playing in the WNBA, Pebley was an assistant coach at George Mason from 1997 to 1999 during league offseasons. Pebley then was an assistant coach at Colorado State from 1999 to 2001.

On May 1, 2002, Pebley became head coach at Utah State, which reinstated its women's basketball program after a nearly 15-year hiatus, effective in the 2003–04 season. After a 5–22 record in her first season, Utah State improved to 14–14 in Pebley's second season. However, the team won just 23 games in the next three seasons, including a 3–24 record in 2005–06. In the 2008–09 season, Pebley led Utah State to a 16–15 (9–7 WAC) record, including the program's first-ever postseason win in the first round of the WAC Tournament before losing to eventual tournament champion Fresno State. Utah State again made history in 2010–11 by making its first-ever WNIT. In 2011–12, Pebley's final season with Utah State, the team went 21–10 for its first season with 20 or more wins and made the WNIT for the second straight season.

Pebley then was head coach at Fresno State from 2012 to 2014. Pebley went 46–20 (23–8 MW) in her two seasons at Fresno State, with two MW Tournament titles and NCAA Tournament appearances as well. On March 31, 2014 she was named head coach at TCU. TCU made the WNIT in both of Pebley's first two seasons.

Broadcast career 
In the summer of 2016, Pebley served as a color commentator for the Fox Sports Southwest broadcasts of Dallas Wings games alongside sportscaster Ron Thulin.

Head coaching record

References

1975 births
Living people
American Latter Day Saints
American women's basketball coaches
American women's basketball players
Basketball coaches from California
Basketball coaches from Utah
Basketball players from California
Basketball players from Utah
Centers (basketball)
Cleveland Rockers players
Colorado Buffaloes women's basketball players
Colorado State Rams women's basketball coaches
Fresno State Bulldogs women's basketball coaches
George Mason Patriots women's basketball coaches
Parade High School All-Americans (girls' basketball)
People from Fountain Valley, California
Power forwards (basketball)
Sportspeople from Orem, Utah
TCU Horned Frogs women's basketball coaches
Utah Starzz draft picks
Utah Starzz players
Utah State Aggies women's basketball coaches
Women's National Basketball Association announcers